José Antonio Rodríguez Vega (3 December 1957 – 24 October 2002), nicknamed El Mataviejas (The Old Lady Killer), was a Spanish serial killer who raped and killed at least 16 elderly women, ranging in age from 61 to 93 years old, in and around Santander, Cantabria, between August 1987 and April 1988.

Biography
Rodríguez Vega was born in Santander, Cantabria, Spain. Rodríguez Vega hated his mother because she had thrown him out of the house when Rodríguez Vega beat his father, who was terminally ill. In 'revenge' against his mother, Rodríguez Vega started his criminal career raping many women until 17 October 1978 when he was arrested and sentenced to a term of 27 years in prison. However, his behavior while in prison, and his ability to charm his victims into forgiving him led to a reduction in his sentence to 8 years. Released in 1986, Rodríguez Vega's wife left him. He did not take the breakup well, but eventually remarried, this time to a mentally disabled woman, who he tortured and humiliated, all the while keeping up the pretense of having an excellent marriage. He was considered to be a good person, a hardworking man and good husband to those around him.

On 19 May 1988, Rodríguez Vega was arrested while walking on the street Cobo de la Torre in Santander, where he was sharing an apartment with María de las Nieves V.P (23 years old). After being arrested, he confessed to the murders.

Crimes
On 6 August 1987, Rodríguez Vega entered the home of Margarita González (82 years old), raped and suffocated her. He forced the woman to swallow her own false teeth. A few weeks later, on 30 September 1987, Carmen González Fernández (80 years old), was found dead in her home. Rodríguez Vega was accused of this murder. Soon after, in October, Rodríguez Vega killed Natividad Robledo Espinosa (66 years old), beating, raping and suffocating her.

Rodríguez Vega did not kill again until 21 January 1988, when Carmen Martínez González was found dead in her home. On 18 April 1988 he killed Julia Paz Fernández (66 years old), who was also raped and suffocated. She was found naked.

The other victims' identities were not released.

Trial and sentence
His trial began in November 1991 in Santander. At the time of his arrest, he had confessed to the murders but on trial he denied all charges against him and said that the women had died by natural causes.

Rodríguez Vega was diagnosed as a psychopath who was a fastidiously neat individual. His killing was well organized in that he would first identify a victim, then observe her until he was familiar with every aspect of her routine. He would then make contact with the victim, try to gain her trust, using his charm and looks, until he gained access to her home, often under the guise of doing work to or around her home. He was described as a cold-hearted and calculating serial killer who took mementos from each of his kills. When he was arrested, police found a red room where he displayed his mementos, which ranged from a television to a bouquet of plastic flowers. Because of the age of his victims, some of their deaths were attributed to natural causes. The extent of his killing spree was not realized until police released a videotape of his home, showing his mementos. Families of the victims identified objects that linked Rodríguez Vega to their dead relatives.

José Antonio Rodríguez Vega was sentenced to 440 years in prison.

Death
On 24 October 2002, Rodríguez Vega was walking in the prison common grounds when two inmates attacked and brutally stabbed him, inflicting fatal wounds. Rodríguez Vega was buried the next day in a poor coffin. The burial was attended by only two gravediggers.

See also
List of serial killers by country
List of serial killers by number of victims

References

1957 births
1978 crimes in Spain
1987 murders in Spain
1988 murders in Spain
2002 deaths
Male serial killers
People convicted of murder by Spain
People from Santander, Spain
People with antisocial personality disorder
Prisoners who died in Spanish detention
Serial killers murdered in prison custody
Spanish people convicted of murder
Spanish people who died in prison custody
Spanish rapists
Spanish serial killers